Salad Days is the final EP by the American hardcore punk band Minor Threat. It was released in July 1985, two years after the band's breakup, through Dischord Records with the catalog number DIS 015. The EP differs somewhat from the band's previous material. All songs are slower, making a slight departure from the group's hardcore punk style. Tracks "Good Guys" (a remake of The Standells' song "Sometimes Good Guys Don't Wear White") and "Salad Days" both feature an acoustic guitar, and "Salad Days" also has chimes. Like many of Minor Threat's recordings, Salad Days has never been released on CD, but all the songs are available on their 1989 compilation album Complete Discography.

Track listing

Personnel
 Ian MacKaye – lead vocals
 Lyle Preslar – guitar
 Brian Baker – bass
 Jeff Nelson – drums

Production
 Skip Groff; Minor Threat – producers
 Don Zientara – engineer, mixing
 Glen E. Friedman – cover photography
 Tomas Squip; Cynthia Connelly; Glen E. Friedman; Doug Humiski; Jim Saah – photography
 Jeff Nelson – graphic design

Charts

References

1985 EPs
Minor Threat albums
Dischord Records EPs
EPs published posthumously